Muna Madan is a narrative poetry book by Laxmi Prasad Devkota

Muna Madan may also refer to:
Muna Madan (film), 2003 film
Romeo & Muna, 2018 film